Kavell Conner (born February 23, 1987) is a former gridiron football linebacker. He was drafted by the Indianapolis Colts in the seventh round of the 2010 NFL draft. He played college football at Clemson.

Professional career

Indianapolis Colts
Conner debut for the Indianapolis Colts was in 2010. During his stint with the Colts, Conner recorded 236 tackles, 2 forced fumbles, and one sack.

San Diego Chargers
Conner signed with the San Diego Chargers on March 13, 2014. On March 3, 2016, Conner was released by the Chargers.

Baltimore Ravens
On July 27, 2016, Conner signed with the Baltimore Ravens. On August 29, 2016, he was released.

Hamilton Tiger-Cats
On March 8, 2017, Conner signed with the Hamilton Tiger-Cats of the Canadian Football League (CFL).

References

External links
San Diego Chargers bio
Indianapolis Colts bio
Clemson Tigers bio

1987 births
Living people
Sportspeople from Richmond, Virginia
Players of American football from Richmond, Virginia
American football linebackers
Clemson Tigers football players
Indianapolis Colts players
San Diego Chargers players
Baltimore Ravens players
American players of Canadian football
Canadian football linebackers
Hamilton Tiger-Cats players
Players of Canadian football from Virginia